Bittner (occupational name for a cooper or a barrel maker, the name was derived from the Old German word "bute," which means "cask") is a surname. Notable people with the surname include:

Egon Bittner (1921–2011), American sociologist
Eric R. Bittner (born 1965), American scientist
Horst Bittner (1927–2016), German politician (SED) 
Jason Bittner (born 1970), American drummer
John Joseph Bittner (1904–1961), American cancer biologist
Julius Bittner (1874–1939), Austrian composer
Maria Bittner, American linguist
Mark Bittner (born 1951), American writer
Sławomir Maciej Bittner (1923–1944), Polish resistance fighter
Stephan Bittner, German canoeist

See also
Biittner, surname
Bitner, surname
Occupational surnames

German-language surnames
de:Bittner
Surnames of German origin